Costar may refer to:
COmputer STored Ambulatory Record (COSTAR)
Corrective Optics Space Telescope Axial Replacement (COSTAR)
CoStar Group provider of commercial real estate information, marketing and analytic services
Co–Star, a social network based on astrology